Slay the Dragon is a 2019 American documentary film about gerrymandering in the United States from Los Angeles, California-based film production company Participant, directed by Barak Goodman and Chris Durrance. The film, which premiered at the Tribeca Film Festival on April 27, 2019, follows citizens' groups as they work to end the practice of gerrymandering, which they see as undermining democracy. It features Katie Fahey, the activist who founded Voters Not Politicians and led a successful grassroots campaign to ban partisan gerrymandering in Michigan.

Reception
The film has received positive reviews from several critics, including Owen Gleiberman of Variety, who called it "incisive and stirring" and "the most important political film of the year"; Chuck Foster of Film Threat, who called it "educational, inspirational, exciting and, most importantly, interesting"; and Caroline Cao of SlashFilm, who calls it a "tough but necessary documentary about the decay of democracy." At Rotten Tomatoes it currently holds a 100% rating based on 50 reviews.

See also
 REDMAP, Republican Party's Redistricting Majority Project, est. 2010
Ratf**ked

References

External links

2019 documentary films
2019 films
American documentary films
Films postponed due to the COVID-19 pandemic
Gerrymandering in the United States
Participant (company) films
Politics of Michigan
Films directed by Barak Goodman
2010s English-language films
2010s American films